Amphitecna isthmica is a species of plant in the family Bignoniaceae. It is found in Colombia, Costa Rica, and Panama. It is threatened by habitat loss.

References

isthmica
Vulnerable plants
Taxonomy articles created by Polbot